Mirwaiz Mohammad Umar Farooq (born 23 March 1973) is the Mirwaiz of Kashmir. He is an Islamist, separatist political leader of Kashmir. He is also an Islamic religious cleric of Kashmir Valley.

In October 2014, Farooq was listed as one of The 500 Most Influential Muslims by the Royal Islamic Strategic Studies Centre, Jordan.

As the Mirwaiz of Kashmir and chairman of the Hurriyat Conference, Umar Farooq has an important religious and political role in the Kashmir Valley. He is seen as the spiritual leader of Kashmir's Muslims. Farooq served as the chairman of the All Parties Hurriyat Conference from 1993 to 1998, and after its split has served as the chairman of his own faction since 2004.

Early life
At the age of 17, following the assassination of his father by unknown gunmen, Mirwaiz Maulvi Farooq, the leader of the Awami Action Committee, Farooq united 23 Kashmiri pro-freedom organizations into the All Parties Hurriyat Conference (APHC). Mirwaiz Maulvi Farooq's funeral procession on 21 May 1990, witnessed the bloodshed near the Islamia College, wherein 72 people, including four women, were killed; his body was dropped in the middle of the road. This roused public sentiment and gave leverage to Mirwaiz Umar Farooq's political work in the valley. He has constantly tried to raise awareness about the Kashmir issue internationally. He was also shown among the Asian Heroes by Time magazine. He maintains that dialogue must take place with India and Pakistan, so long as the Kashmiri aspirations are heard as well.

He became the 14th Mirwaiz (Kashmiri term for the traditional preacher of Muslims in Kashmir) on 30 May 1990. 
Rediff On The NeT's Chindu Sreedharan interviewed him in 1997, in which he described the role of Mirwaiz in Kashmir politics:-

"My family played a major role in evolving politics here. The first party, the Muslim Conference, was established in the valley in 1931. My great grandfather, the then Mirwaiz headed it. In fact, it was he who introduced Sheikh Abdullah to the people. Later, Abdullah formed the Jammu & Kashmir National Conference and my grandfather was exiled to Pakistan where he died.

My father then took over. In 1963, he formed another party -- the People's Action Committee -- which stood for giving people their basic rights. Till 1990 when he was assassinated, he was campaigning for that cause. So all along, the political role has been present in the institution of the Mirwaiz."

Political career

The All Parties Hurriyat Conference, an alliance of Kashmiri political and social organisations seeking a referendum, was formed in September 1993 and Farooq was elected as its first chairman due to it consisting mostly of secular organisations, despite Syed Ali Shah Geelani being the initial choice. Geelani replaced him as chairman of the organisation in 1998.

The appointment of Mohammad Abbas Ansari as chairman precipitated a crisis in the Hurriyat and it split in September 2003 with the breakaway faction electing Geelani as its chairman. Farooq was appointed by the faction led by Ansari to try to re-unify the organisation. Ansari resigned from his position on 7 July 2004 and Farooq was appointed as the interim chairman in his place. Farooq however stated that he would not take over the position and only the executive council will appoint one after being formed. He accepted the position after being appointed by the executive council on 8 August 2004. He was re-elected as chairman of the faction for two years in 2006, and 2009.

Education
Before joining Kashmir politics, Farooq was an alumnus of Burn Hall School in Srinagar. He had an interest in computer science and wanted to become a software engineer. He holds a postgraduate degree in Islamic Studies called ‘Moulvi Fazil’, and a PhD from the Kashmir University, on the topic "Politico-Islamic role of Shah-e-Hamdan", a 14th-century Islamic scholar who introduced Islam in the Valley.

Personal life
Mirwaiz Umar Farooq has been married to Kashmiri-American Sheeba Masoodi since 2002. They have two daughters, Maryam and Zainab; and a son, Ibrahim who was born on 11 February 2017.

Sheeba Masoodi is the youngest daughter of Sibtain Masoodi, a doctor from the Barzulla locality of Srinagar (famous for its Bone and Joints Hospital), who settled in Buffalo, New York in the early 70s.

Mirwaiz's sister, Rabia Farooq, is a doctor currently based in the United States.

See also
 All Parties Hurriyat Conference
 Mirwaiz
 Mohammad Abbas Ansari
 Syed Ali Shah Geelani

References

Living people
Kashmiri people
Kashmir separatist movement
Jammu and Kashmir politicians
1973 births
People from Srinagar